West Lexham is a village and former civil parish, now in the parish of Lexham, in the Breckland district, in the county of Norfolk, England. In 1931 the parish had a population of 101. On 1 April 1935 the parish was abolished to form Lexham.

The villages name literally means, 'leech homestead/village', but probably in the sense of 'physician'.

The nearest railway station is at King’s Lynn for the Fen Line which runs between King’s Lynn and Cambridge. The nearest airport is Norwich International Airport.

West Lexham is the birthplace of Philip Skippon (c. 1600, West Lexham, Norfolk – c. 20 February 1660) who was an English soldier who fought in the English Civil War.  He rose to the rank of Major General in the Parliamentarian New Model Army and was one of Oliver Cromwell's most senior generals.  He fought at several major battles of the Civil War and before that had been a professional soldier in various wars in mainland Europe.

References

External links

St Nicholas on the European Round Tower Churches website

Villages in Norfolk
Former civil parishes in Norfolk
Breckland District